Richard Sui On Chang (November 30, 1941 – August 30, 2017) was bishop of the Episcopal Diocese of Hawaii from 1997 to 2006.

Early life and education
He was born on November 30, 1941, in Honolulu in the then Territory of Hawaii. Chang’s studied at Trinity College in Hartford, Connecticut, from where he graduated with a Bachelor of Arts. He then earned a Master of Divinity from Church Divinity School of the Pacific in 1966. That same year, on March 5, he was ordained deacon and then priest on September 4, by the Bishop of Hawaii Harry S. Kennedy.

Ordained Ministry
After ordination, he became assistant Holy Nativity Church in Honolulu and in 1970, became rector of All Saints' Church in Kapaa, Hawaii, where he remained till 1978. Simultaneously, he also served as Archdeacon of Hawaii from 1970 till 1974. In 1979, he was appointed as the executive officer of the Diocese of Hawaii. In 1986, he moved to New York City to serve as Chief Operations Officer of the Episcopal Church Centre and as assistant to the Presiding Bishop Edmond L. Browning. He also became an honorary canon of Holy Trinity Cathedral in Paris.

Episcopacy
On June 29, 1995, Chang was elected Bishop of Hawaii on the third ballot, during a special convention held in St Andrew's Cathedral, Honolulu. He was consecrated Bishop of Hawaii on January 4, 1997 by Presiding Bishop Edmond L. Browning. Chang retired in 2006 and died on August 30, 2017 in Honolulu following an illness.

See also 
List of bishops of the Episcopal Church in the United States of America

External links 
From Hawaii's Bishop Richard S.O. Chang: A Statement on Windsor Report

References

1941 births
2017 deaths
ʻIolani School alumni
Trinity College (Connecticut) alumni
Church Divinity School of the Pacific alumni
People from Honolulu
Episcopal bishops of Hawaii
20th-century American Episcopalians